Serguei Outschakov (born 11 May 1968 in Arkhangelsk) is a Ukrainian former road bicycle racer. He won stages in all three Grand Tours. In 1997 Tour de France he finished first in the 11th stage but was relegated to third place for not holding his line in the final sprint. His Tour de France stage victory came in  1995 when he and Lance Armstrong broke away and Outschakov won in the sprint.  According to the ESPN “30 for 30” documentary, “Lance”, the loss to Outschakov was the impetus for Armstrong’s decision to start taking EPO.

Major results

1988
 1st Stage 9 Olympia's Tour
1990
 1st Stage 5b (ITT) Giro delle Regioni
1992
 1st Giro del Mendrisiotto
1993
 1st Stage 18 Vuelta a España
1994
 1st Acht van Chaam
1995
 1st Stage 13 Tour de France
 1st Stage 20 Giro d'Italia
 1st  Overall Étoile de Bessèges
1st Stages 2 & 4 (ITT)
 1st Profronde van Surhuisterveen
 8th Overall Volta a la Comunitat Valenciana
 10th Overall Paris–Nice
1996
 1st Stage 22 Giro d'Italia
 6th Veenendaal–Veenendaal
1997
 1st GP Chiasso
 1st Stages 3 & 8 Volta a Catalunya
 1st Stage 6 Vuelta y Ruta de Mexico
 2nd Châteauroux Classic
 4th Gent–Wevelgem
 7th Milan–San Remo
1999
 1st Stage 10 Vuelta a España
 1st Stage 4 Sachsen Tour
2002
 1st Stage 2 Euskal Bizikleta

Grand Tour general classification results timeline

References

External links

1968 births
Ukrainian male cyclists
Living people
Ukrainian Tour de France stage winners
Ukrainian Giro d'Italia stage winners
Ukrainian Vuelta a España stage winners
Cyclists at the 1996 Summer Olympics
Cyclists at the 2000 Summer Olympics
Olympic cyclists of Ukraine
Sportspeople from Arkhangelsk